The Toronto Street Post Office, also known as Toronto's Seventh Post Office, is a heritage building in Toronto, Ontario, Canada. It was completed in 1853 and is located at 10 Toronto Street in downtown Toronto. The building was designed by Frederick William Cumberland and Thomas Ridout in the Greek Revival style.

History
It served as a post office until 1872 and as a government office building until 1937. It was then used by the Bank of Canada until 1959, when it became the head office of E. P. Taylor's Argus Corporation, which was subsequently controlled by Conrad Black. It was here that Conrad Black was taped removing boxes of documents from the office.

In 1958, the building was designated a National Historic Site of Canada. In 2006, it was designated by the City of Toronto under the Ontario Heritage Act (By-law 182–2006).

See also
 Argus Corporation
 List of oldest buildings and structures in Toronto

References

External links

 Property Details - City of Toronto Inventory of Heritage Properties
 Info at the Canadian Register of Historic Places
 10 Toronto Street

Buildings and structures in Toronto
Former post office buildings
Post office buildings in Canada
Greek Revival architecture in Canada
City of Toronto Heritage Properties